Simon Blair Doull (born 6 August 1969) is a New Zealand radio personality, commentator and former international cricketer. He was a right-arm medium pacer, who was capable of swing bowling away from the right hander, Simon Doull was plagued by injuries as a result of which his international career was cut short. Playing for the New Zealand national cricket team, he figured in just 32 Tests and 42 ODIs, taking 98 and 36 wickets respectively. Doull's finest hour arrived when he took 7–65 against India in the Boxing day Wellington Test in 1998. He played his last Test, against Australia, in March 2000 before turning to commentary and broadcasting.

He is the younger brother of Lincoln Doull, who played for Wellington in the early 1990s.

Doull took his career best bowling figures of 7 for 65 in the Boxing Day Test in 1998 against India at the Basin Reserve in Wellington. Due to that performance, he reached a career-high ranking of 6 in the ICC Player Rankings on 26 December 1998.

Doull suffered persistent injuries throughout his career, including numerous back problems and a career-threatening knee injury during New Zealand's 1999 tour of England.

After cricket
Currently, Doull works as a cricket commentator for New Zealand's Magic Talk. Until recently he was part of the Morning Rumble team on the radio station, The Rock.

He has been part of the commentary team for the Indian Premier League since the very beginning in 2008.

References

External links
 

1969 births
Living people
People from Pukekohe
New Zealand One Day International cricketers
New Zealand Test cricketers
New Zealand cricketers
Northern Districts cricketers
New Zealand cricket commentators
Radio Sport
Cricketers at the 1999 Cricket World Cup